The 2018 Malaysia FA Cup Final was the 29th final of the Malaysia FA Cup, the Malaysia football cup competition. Pahang won the cup after defeating Selangor 2–0.

Background 
The final was played on 7 July 2018 at Bukit Jalil National Stadium.

Route to the final 

Note: In all results below, the score of the finalist is given first.

Selangor

Pahang

Ticket allocation 
Each club received an allocation of 80,000 tickets; 30,750 tickets for Selangor, 30,750 tickets for Pahang and 18,500 tickets for online purchase.

Rules
The final was played as a single match. If tied after regulation, extra time and, if necessary, penalty shoot-out would be used to decide the winner.

Match

Details

References

Final
FA Final